Vasilevich may refer to:

Fedor Vasilevich Tokarev (1871–1968), Russian weapons designer and deputy of the Supreme Soviet of the USSR 1937–1950
Matvei Vasilevich Golovinsky (1865–1920), Russian-French writer, journalist and political activist
Ilya Vasilevich (born 2000), Belarusian footballer
Tatjana Vasilevich (born 1977), Ukrainian chess player, and an international master

See also
Vasilev
Vasilievichy